Saltö is an island in the eastern part of the Blekinge archipelago in Blekinge Län, southern Sweden. The city of Karlskrona is spread over 30 islands, one of which is Saltö. Dragsöviken is the sound between Saltö and Dragsö.

References

Islands of Blekinge County